KROG (96.9 FM) is a radio station broadcasting an active rock music format. Licensed to Grants Pass, Oregon, United States, the station serves the Medford-Ashland area.  The station is currently owned by Opus Broadcasting Systems.

The station is located in the OPUS Building in Northwest Medford near the intersection of
Sage Road & Highway 238.

History
96.9 KFMJ had an Adult Rock format before switching to Country “K97” KYJC-FM in 1992.

In 1996, 96.9 became KROG “97 FM The Rogue” with a Hot Adult Contemporary  format, which became more Modern AC toward the end of the 90's.

In the early 2000s, KROG rebranded as “Star 97” with Hot Adult Contemporary.  Not long after that, the station became “97 The Rogue” with an Alternative format, which lead to a more Rock-based sound as “New Rock 96-9 The Rogue” later in the decade.

With 106.3 KZZE flipping from active rock to adult album alternative KYVL in 2015, KROG transitioned to active rock “Rock 96-9 The Rogue” by 2016.

Translators
KROG broadcasts on the following translators and booster:

References

External links
Official Website
KROG Myspace Page

Active rock radio stations in the United States
Grants Pass, Oregon
ROG
Radio stations established in 1981
1981 establishments in Oregon